Evgenii Glyva, born 10 November 1983, is a Ukrainian ultra-distance and mountain runner who lives in Sumy, Ukraine.

Glyva is a trainer of young athletes and he started running long-distances in 2010 quickly achieving international success. His first important result at international level was reached in 2010 with the 4th position at the 100 km del Passatore, in 2011 he won the Notte delle Fiandre. After a couple of year of experience (2012-2013) with good positions in the most important international Ultramarathon and Mountain marathon, his career exploded in 2014 with the victory at the Strasimeno, and the podium at the Wings for Life World Run and the Oman desert marathon. His best year, so far, was 2015 when he won the Swiss Alpine Marathon, and the Kiev Marathon, and he was in the podium of the Strasimeno, the Oman desert marathon, the 50 km di Romagna, the Pistoia-Abetone Ultramarathon and the 7 valleys run ultramarathon (Poland).

In 2016 he confirmed his leadership as ultramarathon and mountain runner with the victory (and race record) at the Strasimeno and the Wings for Life World Run Austria, the second position at the Swiss Alpine Marathon and at the Oman desert marathon, and the third position at the Zermatt Marathon and at the Kiev Marathon.

In 2017 he must temporary stop his activity because the operation to the Achille's tendon which gave him a lot of troubles.

In 2018 he restarted to run and he suddenly was second at the Strasimeno ultramarathon and he won the Al Marmoon ultramarathon.

Wins
Ultramarathon des RTL 2010
Nacht van West-Vlaanderen Notte delle Fiandre 2011
Ultramarathon des RTL 2012
Strasimeno 2014
Swiss Alpine Marathon 2015
Kyiv Marathon 2015
Visegrad Marathon 2015
Strasimeno 2016, with race record
Wings for Life World Run Austria 2016
Kyiv Euro Marathon 2018
Al Marmoon 50km ultramarathon 2018

Second position
Strasimeno 2012
100 km del Passatore 2013
Strasimeno 2015
Oman desert Marathon 2015
Swiss Alpine Marathon 2016
Oman desert Marathon 2016
Strasimeno 2018

Third position
Wings for Life World Run 2014
Oman desert marathon 2014
50 km di Romagna 2015
Pistoia-Abetone Ultramarathon 2015
7 valleys run ultramarathon 2015
Zermatt Marathon 2016
Kiev Marathon 2016
ATB Dnipro Marathon 2018
Oman desert marathon 2019

External links

Deutsche Ultramarathon Vereinigung
Evgenii Glyva´s webpage

1983 births
Living people
Ukrainian male long-distance runners
Ukrainian male marathon runners
Ukrainian ultramarathon runners
Male ultramarathon runners